Charles de l'Écluse, L'Escluse, or Carolus Clusius (19 February 1526 – 4 April 1609), seigneur de Watènes, was an Artois doctor and pioneering botanist, perhaps the most influential of all 16th-century scientific horticulturists.

Life

Clusius was born Charles de l' Écluse in 1526, in Arras (Dutch Atrecht), then in the County of Artois, Spanish Netherlands, now northern France (Hauts-de-France). At the urging of his father, who wanted him to enter the law, he commenced his studies in Latin and Greek at Louvain, followed by civil law. His father then gave him some money to move to Marburg to further his legal studies, but after eight months when his mentor moved away from Marburg he switched to theology, initially at Marburg and then on the suggestion of one of his professors at Wittenberg, where he also began a study of philosophy. Even at Marburg he had also developed an interest in plants that he continued in Wittenberg. Aware of the emerging study of botany, he decided to move to France to study medicine at the University of Montpellier (1551–1554), under professor Guillaume Rondelet, though he never practiced medicine, or styled himself as a physician. He died in Leiden in the Netherlands in 1609, at the age of 83.

While little is known of his relationships, he formed many friendships, both male and female, and his extensive preserved correspondence throws considerable light on those friendships. His male friends were largely academic, with whom he corresponded in Latin, his female friends (at least 35 are known) predominantly collectors and horticulturalists with whom he corresponded in their vernacular, but treated all with the same respect. Unlike his male friends, who were from all over the world, his women friends were all in the Habsburg countries, especially the southern Netherlands and Austria.

Work 

In the 1560s Clusius was employed by the Fugger banking family  as tutor to one of Anton Fugger's sons and as agent, including a plant collecting expedition to Spain, where he became familiar with plants introduced from the New World. In 1573, with the help of Ogier Ghiselin de Busbecq, he was appointed prefect (director) of the imperial medical garden in Vienna by Emperor Maximilian II (1564–1576) and made Gentleman of the Imperial Chamber. Busbecq, who had been ambassador to the Ottoman Empire (1554–1562) under the previous emperor, Ferdinand I (1558–1564), was a keen gardener and soon arranged for exotic bulbs to be sent from the court at Constantinople to the gardens in Vienna. Clausius was discharged from the imperial court shortly after the death of Maximilian and accession of his son Rudolf II (1576–1612) in 1576.

After leaving Vienna in the late 1580s he established himself in Frankfurt am Main, before his appointment as professor at the University of Leiden in October 1593, where he also became the first praefectus (prefect) of the city's new botanical garden, the Hortus Academicus, associated with the university. There he helped to create one of the earliest formal botanical gardens of Europe  and his detailed planting lists have made  it possible to recreate his garden near where it originally lay. He was invited to join the Accademia dei Lincei as a corresponding member in 1604, but declined.

He traveled extensively throughout Europe, furthering his knowledge of plants. Clusius was among the first to study the flora of Austria, under the auspices of Maximilian II. He was the first botanist to climb the Ötscher and the Schneeberg in Lower Austria, which was also the first documented ascent of the latter. His illustrated works form an important chapter in sixteenth century natural history, producing a large body of drawing and watercolours. The latter, forming part of an important collection of late sixteenth century botanical illustration, the Libri picturati. He was responsible for the cultivation of a number of plants, new to Europe, including the tulip, potato, and horse chestnut. Clusius was widely influential in European science and culture and his circle of correspondents included princes and aristocrats such as Wilhelm IV of Hessen-Kassel (1567–1592) and Princesse Marie de Brimeu, who was one of his most frequent correspondents.

Study of tulips 

In the history of gardening he is remembered not only for his scholarship but also for his work on tulips. At Leiden, his cultivation of tulips in the botanic gardens there, laid the foundations of the Dutch tulip bulb industry. In particular his observations on tulip's "breaking" — a phenomenon discovered in the late 19th century to be due to a virus — causing the many different flamed and feathered varieties, which led to the speculative tulip mania of the 1630s. Clusius laid the foundations of Dutch tulip breeding and the bulb industry today.

Clusius' life and times 

During Clusius' lifetime, botanical knowledge was undergoing enormous expansion, partly fueled by the expansion of the known plant world by New World exploration, and is thought of as a botanical Renaissance. Europe became engrossed with natural history from the 1530s, and gardening and cultivation of plants became a passion and prestigious pursuit from monarchs to universities. The first botanical gardens appeared as well as the first illustrated botanical encyclopaedias, together with thousands of watercolours and woodcuts. The experience of farmers, gardeners, foresters, apothecaries and physicians was being supplemented by the rise of the plant expert. Collecting became a discipline, specifically the Kunst- und Wunderkammern (cabinets of curiosities) outside of Italy and the study of naturalia became widespread through many social strata. The great botanists of the sixteenth century were all, like Clusius, originally trained as physicians, who pursued a knowledge of plants not just for medicinal properties, but in their own right. Chairs in botany, within medical faculties were being established in European universities throughout the sixteenth century in reaction to this trend, and the scientific approach of observation, documentation and experimentation was being applied to the study of plants.

Clusius' influence was a key factor in all these developments with his pioneering and influential publications, and introduction of hitherto unknown exotic plants to the Low Countries. As adviser to princes and aristocrats and central figure of a vast European network of exchange, he successfully transmitted his knowledge widely. He is considered one of the most eminent botanists of the European Renaissance, and his influence on tulip breeding continues to the present day.

Publications 

His first publication was a French translation of Rembert Dodoens's herbal, "Histoire des Plantes", published in Antwerp in 1557 by van der Loë. His Antidotarium sive de exacta componendorum miscendorumque medicamentorum ratione ll. III ... nunc ex Ital. sermone Latini facti (1561) initiated his fruitful collaboration with the renowned Plantin printing press at Antwerp, which permitted him to issue late-breaking discoveries in natural history and to ornament his texts with elaborate engravings. Clusius, as he was known to his contemporaries, published two major original works: his Rariorum aliquot stirpium per Hispanias observatarum historia (1576)— is one of the earliest books on Spanish flora— and his Rariorum stirpium per Pannonias observatorum Historiae (1583) is the first book on Austrian and Hungarian alpine flora.

Clusius' collected works were published in two parts: Rariorum plantarum historia (1601) contains his Spanish and Austrian flora and adds more information about new plants as well as a pioneering mycological study on mushrooms from Central Europe (as appendix: Fungorum in Pannoniis observatorum, covering toxic fungi in the section: "Fungi noxii et perniciosi"); and Exoticorum libri decem (1605) is an important survey of exotic flora and fauna, both still often consulted. His Rariorum plantarum, published in four books, is illustrated with many woodcuts of botanical specimens, and is indicative of the new interest in botany and botanical gardens which arose during the Renaissance. He contributed as well to Abraham Ortelius's map of Spain. Clusius translated several contemporary works in natural science. Clusius' vast correspondence with his European contemporaries has been preserved at Leiden University and made available on the internet by the Scaliger Institute there (The Clusius Project). The collection contains about 1,500 letters from 320 correspondents in six languages during the period 1560–1609.

List of selected publications 

 see 

 
 1567: Garcia de Orta, Aromatum et simplicium aliquot medicamentorum apud Indios nascentium historia: Latin translation from Portuguese
 1574: Nicolás Monardes, De simplicibus medicamentis ex occidentali India delatis quorum in medicina usus est: Latin translation from Spanish
 1579: Revised edition under the title Simplicium medicamentorum ex novo orbe delatorum, quorum in medicina usus est, historia 
 1582: Compendium of the translations from Garcia de Orta and Nicolás Monardes, now combined with selections from Cristóbal Acosta, Tractado de las drogas y medicinas de las Indias orientales 1593: Further revised edition of this compendium
 
  (also at Botanicus:   Rariorum plantarum  )
 1605: Exoticorum libri decem, including final revised editions of the translations from Garcia de Orta, Nicolás Monardes and Cristóvão da Costa
 

Translations of his work

 1589: Dell'historia dei semplici aromati et altre cose che vengono portare dall'Indie Orientali pertinente all'uso della medicina ... di Don Garzia dall'Horto. Italian re-translation by Annibale Briganti of Clusius's edited translations of Garcia de Orta and Nicolás Monardes
 "Some notes of Charles L`ecluse a native of Gaul Upon the history of spices by Garcia de Orta's Aromatum et Simplicium Historia", Translated by Reverend Martin Pollard, O.S.B., Edited and Introduction by Garry D. Gitzen, Fort Nehalem Publishing, Wheeler, Oregon (2009)
  (Translation of a section from the Rariorum plantarum historia, 1601: see )

 Legacy 

Justus Lipsius called Clusius "the father of all the beautiful gardens in this country".

 Eponomy 

His contribution to the study of alpine plants has led to many of them being named in his honour, such as Gentiana clusii, Potentilla clusiana and Primula clusiana. The genus Clusia'' (whence the family Clusiaceae) also honours Clusius. His work formed an important step in the development of modern botany.

See also 
 Botanical gardens
 History of botany
 History of gardening

Notes

References

Bibliography

Books 
 
 
 
  PDF version
 Review

Chapters 
 , in 
 , in

Articles and theses 
 
 
  (English abstract)

Websites

Leiden University 
 
 
 
 
 
 
 Correspondence

External links 
 Clusius at Biodiversity Heritage Library

1526 births
1609 deaths
People from Arras
Flemish botanists
Pre-Linnaean botanists
Translators to Latin
Translators to French
Translators from French
Spanish–French translators
Translators from Portuguese
Translators from Dutch
16th-century translators
17th-century translators
17th-century Dutch scientists
Academic staff of Leiden University
Burials at Pieterskerk, Leiden
History of botany
16th-century Dutch botanists
17th-century Dutch botanists
Dutch medical writers
16th-century Dutch physicians
Biology and natural history in the Dutch Republic
16th-century Latin-language writers
17th-century Latin-language writers
Scientists of the Habsburg Netherlands